Thespis is a genus of Asian plants in the tribe Astereae within the family Asteraceae.

 Species
 Thespis divaricata DC. - China (Guangdong, Yunnan), Indian Subcontinent (Bangladesh, Nepal, Assam, Manipur, Meghalaya, Tripura, Tamil Nadu, West Bengal, Uttar Pradesh), Indochina
 Thespis erecta DC. - India, Laos, Myanmar, Vietnam
 Thespis integrifolia Gagnep. - Vietnam 
 Thespis tonkinensis Gagnep. - Vietnam

References

Astereae
Asteraceae genera